The 1961–62 UCLA basketball team was coached by John Wooden in his 14th year. The Bruins finished 1st in the AAWU (10–2), and accepted a bid to the 1962 NCAA Tournament. The Bruins won the NCAA Far West Regional and played in the Final Four. UCLA lost 72-70 to Cincinnati and then in the third-place game on March 24, 1962, in Louisville, Ky. (Freedom Hall), Wake Forest defeated UCLA 82-80. The Bruins finished the season as the 4th best team in the nation.

Roster

Schedule

|-
!colspan=9 style=|Regular Season

|-
!colspan=12 style="background:#;"| NCAA Tournament

Source

Draft list

References 

 "2011-12 UCLA Bruins Men's Basketball Media Guide". University of California Los Angeles. Retrieved July 1, 2014.

UCLA Bruins men's basketball seasons
UCLA Bruins
UCLA Bruins
Ucla Bruins
Ucla
NCAA Division I men's basketball tournament Final Four seasons